Northborough is a town in Worcester County, Massachusetts, United States. The official spelling of the town's name is "Northborough," but the alternative spelling "Northboro" is also used. The population was 15,741 at the 2020 census.

History

The areas surrounding Northborough were first settled by The Nipmuc people. Europeans set up a plantation on May 14, 1656, following a petition for resettlement from the people of the Sudbury Plantation to the General Court of the Bay Colony. On January 24, 1766, the district of Northborough was established within neighboring Westborough. On August 23, 1775, the district became a town, and on June 20, 1807, part of neighboring Marlborough was annexed to Northborough.

The first meeting house was established in 1746, with the legal governor of the town being called the Town Minister. The first Town Minister was Reverend John Martyn.

In 1775, Northborough split off as the "north borough" of Westborough, much as Westborough had split from Marlborough some 58 years before. However, the two towns shared a meetinghouse for some time more.

Geography

Adjacent towns and cities

Northborough is located in Central Massachusetts, and shares a border with five towns and one city:
Southborough is located to the southeast. The border, however, is only 500 yards long and is in the woods with no accessible trail.
Marlborough is located to the north of Southborough and due east of Northborough. The most accessible way to enter Marlborough from Northborough is via U.S. Route 20.
Berlin is located to the north of Northborough.
Boylston is located to the northwest.
Shrewsbury is located to the west, and is the town that separates Northborough from Worcester. Shrewsbury is accessible via Route 20 or Route 9.
Westborough is located to the south of Northborough, and is accessible via Route 9 or Route 135

Of the six towns that make up Northborough's borders, and including Northborough as the seventh, Northborough is the fourth largest town by population. Marlborough is the largest while Berlin is the smallest.

Demographics

By the 2010 census, the population had reached 14155. By the 2020 census, the population was 15,741.

As of the census of 2000, there were 14,013 people, 4,906 households, and 3,865 families residing in the town. The racial makeup of the town was 93.01% White, 0.65% Black or African American, 0.08% Native American, 5.05% Asian, 0.07% Pacific Islander, 0.36% from other races, and 0.78% from two or more races. Hispanic or Latino of any race were 1.28% of the population.

There were 4,906 households, out of which 43.4% had children under the age of 18 living with them, 68.9% were married couples living together, 7.6% had a female householder with no husband present, and 21.2% were non-families. 17.1% of all households were made up of individuals, and 6.2% had someone living alone who was 65 years of age or older. The average household size was 2.83 and the average family size was 3.22.

In the town, the population was spread out, with 29.5% under the age of 18, 4.5% from 18 to 24, 31.3% from 25 to 44, 25.0% from 45 to 64, and 9.8% who were 65 years of age or older. The median age was 37 years. For every 100 females, there were 96.8 males. For every 100 females age 18 and over, there were 93.0 males.

The median income for a household in the town was $99,781, and the median income for a family was $120,480. Males had a median income of $65,437 versus $51,042 for females. The per capita income for the town was $42,889. About 1.7% of families and 2.8% of the population were below the poverty line, including 2.0% of those under age 18 and 9.3% of those age 65 or over.

Government

Library

The Northborough Free Library was established in 1868. In fiscal year 2009, the town of Northborough spent 1.5% ($645,208) of its budget on its public library—approximately $43.41 per person, per year ($53.36 adjusted for inflation to 2021).

Education

Public schools
The Northborough-Southborough Public School District is home to four public elementary schools serving grades pre-kindergarten through grade 5. They include Lincoln Street School, Marguerite E. Peaslee School, Fannie E. Proctor School, and Marion E. Zeh school.

In 2002, the Northborough Middle School was renamed after former superintendent of schools, Robert E. Melican.

The public high school serving Northborough is Algonquin Regional High School, and is shared with Southborough. The mascot for Northborough-Southborough students was the Tomahawk, but was officially changed to the Titans in early 2022. Debates have erupted over whether Northborough and Southborough should have separate high schools; however, citizens of both Northborough and Southborough successfully fought to keep the school regionalized. Assabet Valley Regional Technical High School is an alternate choice for Northborough students.

Private schools
Private schools include The Cornerstone Academy, a private elementary school, and Saint Bernadette School, a private Roman Catholic elementary and middle school.

Points of interest
Juniper Hill Golf Course
Tougas Family Farm

Sports
The New England Baseball Complex is located at the intersection of Route 20 and Route 9 in Northborough. The newly built complex is home to the New England Ruffnecks, a youth baseball association. Many high schools, including Algonquin have had MIAA games at the NEBC. Regional colleges and universities have hosted opponents at the New England Baseball Complex.
Their little league of Algonquin shared with Southborough is open to any children.

Notable people

 Joseph Allen, pastor
 Joseph Henry Allen, (August 21, 1820 – March 20, 1898) Unitarian minister and scholar
 William Francis Allen, (August 21, 1820 – March 20, 1898) classical scholar
 Mark Fidrych, (August 14, 1954 – April 13, 2009), former pitcher for the Detroit Tigers and 1976 American League Rookie of the Year
 John Kellette, (June 1873 – August 7, 1922) an American songwriter, wrote the song "I'm Forever Blowing Bubbles" in 1918
 Dorian McMenemy, (born October 28, 1996) Olympic swimmer for the Dominican Republic
 Gregory Goodwin Pincus, (April 9, 1903 – August 22, 1967) one of the three "fathers" of the birth control pill
 Jon Radoff, (born September 17, 1972) internet entrepreneur and author
 Nathaniel Raymond, (born November 11, 1977) an American human rights investigator, specializing in the investigation of war crimes
 Luther Rice, (25 March 1783 – 27 September 1836) American Baptist minister and founder of George Washington University
 Mike Sherman, (born December 19, 1954) coach of the Montreal Alouettes of the Canadian Football League; former head coach of the Green Bay Packers
 Daniel Baird Wesson, (May 18, 1825 – August 4, 1906) American inventor and firearms designer; co-founder of the Smith & Wesson gun manufacturing company

Media

Newspapers
 Metrowest Daily News
 Worcester Telegram and Gazette
 Community Advocate
 Northborough/Southborough Villager (weekly)
 Northborough Patch (online)

References

External links

 
Towns in Worcester County, Massachusetts